The Love Parade was a music festival and technoparade in Berlin, Germany.

Love Parade may also refer to:

 Love Parade disaster, a crowd disaster at the 2010 Love Parade

Film
 The Love Parade, a 1930 American musical comedy directed by Ernst Lubitsch
 Love Parade (film) or How I Learned to Love Women, a 1966 comedy directed by Luciano Salce

Music

Albums
 Lola Dutronic Album 2 – The Love Parade, by Lola Dutronic, 2007
 Love Parade, by Gang Parade, 2019
 Love Parade, by Jeff Scott Soto, 1994

Songs
 "Love Parade" (7eventh Time Down song), 2012
 "Love Parade" (The Boss song), 2011
 "Love Parade" (Orange Range song), 2005
 "The Love Parade" (song), by The Dream Academy, 1985
 "Luv Parade"—"Color of Life", by Misia, 2006
 "Love Parade", by Cassius from Ibifornia, 2016
 "Love Parade", by Yukari Tamura from Hana-furi Tsukiyo to Koi-youbi., 2002
 "The Love Parade", by the Undertones from The Sin of Pride, 1983